David M. Talerico is an American politician from Alaska. A Republican, he has served in the Alaska House of Representatives since 2015. He represents House District 6, a vast district in The Bush that encompasses the Denali Borough and other unincorporated areas. He is the longest-serving mayor of the Denali Borough, in office from 2002 to 2012, and briefly served on the Borough Assembly again from 2013 to 2014, when he was elected to the House of Representatives. He is a longtime resident of Healy.

Talerico previously ran unsuccessfully for a House seat against David Guttenberg, a Democrat from Fairbanks. He worked for Republican Representative Doug Isaacson as a legislative staffer from 2012 to 2013. He is a miner by trade and was the director of human resources and safety at the Usibelli Coal Mine at the time of his election to the House of Representatives in 2014.

References

Living people
Mayors of places in Alaska
Republican Party members of the Alaska House of Representatives
People from Denali Borough, Alaska
American miners
21st-century American politicians
Year of birth missing (living people)